The first season of Canada's Drag Race premiered on July 2, 2020. The cast was announced on May 14, 2020. The winner of the first season of Canada’s Drag Race was Priyanka, with Rita Baga and Scarlett BoBo as runners-up.

Casting occurred in mid-2019 with production starting in fall 2019. On September 26, 2019, it was announced that the judges panel will include RuPaul's Drag Race season 11 runner-up Brooke Lynn Hytes, actor Jeffrey Bowyer-Chapman and fashion model Stacey McKenzie. Bell Media personality Traci Melchor also appeared as a recurring cast member, with the title "Canada's Squirrel Friend"; her role entailed participatory support in challenges, including co-judging the Canada Gay-M mini-challenge, hosting a sheTalk red carpet segment prior to Snatch Game, and serving as one of the judges of the Miss Loose Jaw pageant. Melchor also appeared as the special guest host for the season finale.

The season consisted of ten one-hour episodes.

The Season 1 queens participated in a Canada's Drag Race Anniversary Extravaganza reunion special, airing on Crave September 6, 2021 in advance of the second season launch.

Contestants 

(Ages, names, and cities stated are at time of filming.)

Notes:

Contestant progress

Lip syncs
Legend:

Guests

Guest hosts
The guest host of a Canada's Drag Race episode performs much of RuPaul's role in a regular Ru-hosted season, including the introductions to the runway and Lip Sync for Your Life segments, and delivers commentary as a judge, but does not have a direct say in determining the winners or losers of the challenges and lipsyncs. Except for Michelle Visage, who appeared because of her role as a regular judge on the original RuPaul's Drag Race, all other guest hosts were Canadian actors, musicians or media personalities. Season 1 guest hosts included:

 Elisha Cuthbert
 Jade Hassouné
 Deborah Cox
 Evan Biddell
 Mary Walsh
 Tom Green
 Allie X
 Amanda Brugel
 Michelle Visage
 Traci Melchor

Special guests
Several guests appeared in episodes, but did not judge on the main stage. Photographer Matt Barnes appeared in Episode 1. Singer Ralph and choreographer Hollywood Jade appeared in Episodes 3 and 10. Episode 5 featured Colin McAllister and Justin Ryan, interior decorators and television presenters. Crystal, a contestant from the first series of RuPaul's Drag Race UK appeared in Episode 6. The seventh episode featured actor and producer Stefan Brogren as well as drag queen Michelle DuBarry. Comedian Sabrina Jalees appeared in Episode 9.

Pit Crew
The show's Pit Crew attracted media attention for including Mina Gerges, who was the first plus-size man to be featured in the Pit Crew on any edition of the series, and Travis L'Henaff, an HIV-positive model and activist who has been featured in HIV/AIDS awareness campaigns in Canada. Other members included Ming Yao, Seth Falk and Evan Boutsov.

Episodes 

<onlyinclude>{{Episode table|background= #B30427 | overall=6 |season= 6 |title= 23 |airdate= 16 |episodes= 

{{Episode list/sublist|Canada's Drag Race (season 1)
 |EpisodeNumber   = 2
 |EpisodeNumber2  = 2
 |Title           = Her-itage Moments
 |OriginalAirDate = 
 |ShortSummary    = For this week's mini-challenge, the queens will get into quick drag and audition for a role as a ballerina in The Nutsmacker. Anastarzia Anaquway and BOA win the mini-challenge and become team captains for the main challenge. For the main challenge, the queens will overact in parodies of Heritage Minutes. Anastarzia chooses Kiara, Lemon, Rita Baga and Tynomi Banks for her team, and they star in "I Smell Burnt Tucks". BOA chooses Ilona Verley, Jimbo, Kyne, Priyanka and Tynomi Banks for her team, and they star in "The Muffragettes".

On the runway, category is Not My First Time, a recreated look from one of their first times in drag. Jimbo, Kiara, Lemon and Priyanka receive positive critiques, with Lemon winning the challenge. BOA, Kyne and Tynomi Banks receive negative critiques, with BOA being safe. Kyne and Tynomi Banks lip-sync to "If You Could Read My Mind" by Ultra Naté, Amber, and Jocelyn Enriquez. Tynomi Banks wins the lip-sync and Kyne sashays away.

Guest Host: Jade Hassouné
Mini-Challenge: Get into quick drag and audition for a role as a ballerina in The Nutsmacker
Mini-Challenge Winner: Anastarzia Anaquay and BOA 
Mini-Challenge Prize: A $1,000 gift certificate from Wigs And Grace
Main Challenge: Overact in parodies of Heritage Minutes, "The Muffragettes" and "I Smell Burnt Tucks"
Runway Theme: Not My First Time
Challenge Winner: Lemon 
Main Challenge Prize: $5,000 worth of Anastasia Beverly Hills cosmetics
Bottom Two: Kyne and Tynomi Banks
Lip Sync Song: "If You Could Read My Mind" by Ultra Naté, Amber, and Jocelyn Enriquez
 <span style="color:red">Eliminated:  Kyne </span>Farewell message': "I love you Tynomi I love you all Think of me fondly, now that I've said goodbye. ♡ -Kyne" |LineColor       = #B30427
}}

}}</onlyinclude>

Post-production
Drag Ball and Drag Superstars
Separately from the production of the series, all of the queens from the season participated in Pride events for both Pride Toronto and Fierté Montreal, presented as online streaming specials due to the COVID-19 pandemic in Canada. The Toronto event, Drag Ball presented by Crave, was streamed on June 27, and the Montreal event, Drag Superstars, was streamed on August 14. The Toronto special was directly produced by Crave; the Montreal event was produced by a separate company, but received some production assistance and sponsorship from Crave and the Canada's Drag Race'' production team.

Canada's Drag Race Live at the Drive-In
Following the conclusion of the season, the cast announced a cross-Canada tour, to be performed at drive-in venues due to the ongoing social distancing restrictions remaining in place during the COVID-19 pandemic. Brooke Lynn Hytes hosted, and Priyanka, Scarlett Bobo and Rita Baga were scheduled to appear at every date on the tour, while other cast members would perform at selected dates based on availability; ultimately, however, both Priyanka and Brooke Lynn Hytes had to miss a couple of later dates after being forced to self-isolate due to COVID-19 exposure. 

Priyanka, Scarlett Bobo, Rita Baga and Jimbo also participated in an online panel as part of the 2020 Just for Laughs festival.

Awards

References

2020 Canadian television seasons
2020 in LGBT history
Canada's Drag Race seasons